Loxosceles coheni is a species of spider in the Sicariidae family native to Iran, described in 2021. The species is named after the Canadian singer-songwriter, poet and novelist Leonard Cohen.

References

Sicariidae
Spiders described in 2021
Endemic fauna of Iran
Leonard Cohen